San Jose Earthquakes II is an American professional soccer team that is located in San Jose, California. It is the reserve team of San Jose Earthquakes and participates in MLS Next Pro.

History 
On December 6, 2021, San Jose Earthquakes were named as one of 21 clubs that would field a team in the new MLS Next Pro league beginning in the 2022 season.

Players and staff

Roster

Staff 
 Dan DeGeer – head coach
 Jordan Stewart – assistant coach
 Jeremy Clark – goalkeeper coach

Team record

Year-by-year

Head coaches record

See also 
 San Jose Earthquakes U23
 MLS Next Pro

References

External links 
 

Association football clubs established in 2021
2021 establishments in California
San Jose Earthquakes
Soccer clubs in California
Reserve soccer teams in the United States
MLS Next Pro teams